Cappella SF (San Francisco) is a professional chamber choir founded in 2014 by Ragnar Bohlin, artistic director of the Grammy-award-winning San Francisco Symphony Chorus. Cappella SF is the only professional group in the Bay Area singing acappella music from all periods of the choral repertoire.

Cappella SF has recorded a Christmas CD, Light of Gold, and Facing West, a CD with music by Bay Area composers David Conte and Conrad Susa.

References 

Chamber choirs
Musical groups from San Francisco
A cappella musical groups